Irkutsky is a rural locality (a settlement) in Nikolayevsky Selsoviet, Mikhaylovsky District, Altai Krai, Russia. The population was 22 as of 2013. There is 1 street.

Geography 
Irkutsky is located 32 km northwest of Mikhaylovskoye (the district's administrative centre) by road. Nikolayevka is the nearest rural locality.

References 

Rural localities in Mikhaylovsky District, Altai Krai